Glazier is an unincorporated community in Hemphill County, Texas, United States.  It lies at the intersection of U.S. Highway 60 and State Highway 305, to the northeast of the city of Canadian, the county seat of Hemphill County.  Its elevation is 2,615 feet (797 m).  Local addresses are served by the 79014 ZIP code of the post office in Canadian. Every structure in Glazier except one house and the town's jail was destroyed by a violent tornado on April 9, 1947, and 17 people were killed.

It is in the Canadian Independent School District.

Climate
According to the Köppen Climate Classification system, Glazier has a semi-arid climate, abbreviated "BSk" on climate maps.

Gallery

References

Unincorporated communities in Hemphill County, Texas
Unincorporated communities in Texas